Bruna Takahashi (born July 19, 2000) is a Brazilian table tennis player. She competed at the 2016 Summer Olympics as part of the Brazilian team in the women's team event. At the 2019 Pan American Games in  Lima, Peru, she was seeded #5, and is currently 23rd in the ITTF Women's World Ranking, with 3976 points. This makes her the second best Latin American in the world, after Puerto Rico's Adriana Diaz (18th as of March 2020).

She competed at the 2020 Summer Olympics.

References

External links

2000 births
Living people
Brazilian female table tennis players
Brazilian people of Japanese descent
Olympic table tennis players of Brazil
Table tennis players at the 2016 Summer Olympics
South American Games gold medalists for Brazil
South American Games medalists in table tennis
Competitors at the 2018 South American Games
Table tennis players at the 2018 Summer Youth Olympics
Table tennis players at the 2019 Pan American Games
Pan American Games medalists in table tennis
Pan American Games silver medalists for Brazil
Pan American Games bronze medalists for Brazil
Medalists at the 2019 Pan American Games
Table tennis players at the 2020 Summer Olympics
People from São Bernardo do Campo
Sportspeople from São Paulo (state)
21st-century Brazilian women